Reformed Churches of New Zealand is a Calvinist denomination in New Zealand. The denomination is constituted of 21 member churches, the first seven of which were formed in 1953. Total membership as of 2020 stands at 3,283.

Form of doctrine
The doctrine of the Reformed Churches of New Zealand is expressed in the four confessions of faith to which it subscribes. These are the Heidelberg Catechism (1563), Belgic Confession (1566), Canons of Dort (1619) (known collectively as the Three Forms of Unity), and the Westminster Confession of Faith (1646). Also recognised are the Apostles' Creed, Nicene Creed and Athanasian Creed, all of which summarise the churches' doctrines.

The Reformed Churches of New Zealand are one of the few Calvinist churches internationally to subscribe to both the Three Forms of Unity (common among Reformed churches with origins in the European continent, especially the Netherlands) and the Westminster Confession of Faith (common among Reformed or Presbyterian churches with origins in the British Isles).

Form of governance
The Reformed Churches of New Zealand hold to the system of presbyterian church governance. Each church has a ruling Session composed of elders, one of whom is the church's minister (also known as the teaching elder). Churches which have no minister are said to be vacant. Each church also has deacons who are charged with maintaining the temporal well-being of church members and with alleviating social distress. In larger churches, deacons meet in their own Deacons’ Courts, while in smaller churches they meet together with the rest of the session. Only men are eligible to serve in the offices of minister, elder and deacon.

These churches belong to one of three regional presbyteries which meet three times per year to discuss matters of common interest and to provide mutual oversight. They also meet in synod once every three years to discuss matters of joint interest and to manage activities pertaining to the denomination. Rights of appeal to presbytery and synod are available.

Constituent churches

Ecumenical contacts
The Reformed Churches of New Zealand is a member of the International Conference of Reformed Churches. Sister-church relationships are held with churches abroad which hold to similar doctrine and practice.
Sister churches:
Presbyterian Church of Eastern Australia
Free Reformed Churches of Australia
Presbyterian Reformed Church (Australia)
Orthodox Presbyterian Church (USA)
Canadian and American Reformed Churches
United Reformed Churches in North America
Reformed Churches in South Africa (Gereformeerde Kerke in Suid-Africa)
Sister church (suspended):
Reformed Churches in the Netherlands (Liberated) (Gereformeerde Kerken in Nederland [Vrijgemaakt])
Churches in ecumenical fellowship:
Christian Reformed Churches of Australia
Other churches with which contact is had:
Grace Presbyterian Church of New Zealand

History
Calvinist churches have their origins in the 16th-century Protestant Reformation. In the late 1940s a wave of migrants from the Netherlands settling in New Zealand expected to find their spiritual homes in existing churches of Calvinist persuasion. Instead, they found departures from Calvinist doctrine and practice that they could not overlook. Discussions began in Auckland in 1951 with a view to establishing an indigenous Calvinist denominations. A minister from the Netherlands, Rev J W Deenick, arrived in 1952 to support the fledgling group. The official establishment of the Reformed Churches of New Zealand took place in 1953 at a synod in Wellington, with churches from Auckland, Wellington and Christchurch represented. By the end of that year, further churches began meeting in Hamilton, Nelson and Palmerston North, and a former Presbyterian congregation from Howick (now Bucklands Beach) joined. A further 14 member-churches have since been formed.

Worship
The churches hold worship services twice each Sunday and generally on Christmas Day, Good Friday, Ascension Day and New Year's Eve. Preaching from the Bible is the central element of worship. Preaching is by ordained ministers, or alternatively sermons written by an ordained minister may be read by a lay male session appointee when a minister is not available. Sung praise and corporate prayer are the next most significant elements of worship. The denominational psalter/hymnal, Sing to the Lord, is the main source of hymnody, in which the singing of the Psalms features strongly. Corporate confession of sin and the assurance of God's pardon are an integral part of Sunday morning worship, while in the second service one of the creeds is usually recited in unison.

The sacrament of the Lord's Supper (or Holy Communion) is celebrated at least three-monthly. The sacrament of baptism is administered to new converts and to the infant children of confessing church members.

List of synods

Latest synodical appointments
Standing committees
Church Extension Committee
Church Order Committee
Interchurch Relations Committee
Overseas Mission Board
National Diaconate Committee
National Publishing Committee
Remuneration Committee
Synodical Interim Committee
Hymnal Committee
Study committees
Vicariate Examinations Committee
Church Visitation Committee
Conversion Therapy Response Committee
Other appointments
Stated Clerk
Synodical Treasurer
Deputies for Students to the Ministry
Synodical Archivist
Year Book Editor
Synodical Liaison to Calvinist Cadet Corps
Webmaster

References

Further reading
Dirk Vanderpyl (ed) Trust and Obey: A History of the Reformed Churches of New Zealand: Hamilton: Calvinist Church Publishing Society: 1994.

External links
 Reformed Churches of New Zealand

Christian organizations established in 1953
Reformed denominations in Oceania
Presbyterianism in New Zealand
Calvinist denominations established in the 20th century